The Xavier Musketeers women's basketball team represents Xavier University in Cincinnati, Ohio, United States. The school's team currently competes in the Big East after moving from the Atlantic 10 following the 2012–13 season. The Musketeers are currently coached by Melanie Moore.

History
The Musketeers previously competed in the Midwestern Collegiate Conference after spending the first three years of Division I play in the North Star Conference, beginning in the 1983–1984 season.  The women's basketball team began competing in the 1971–72 season under coach Tony Brueneman and had their first winning season two years later, obtaining a 7–6 record.

Yearly records

NCAA tournament results

References

External links